Charles Auguste, Marquis de La Fare, Conte of Laugères, Baron of Balazuc (1644–1712), was a nobleman, poet and French memorialist.

Biography
La Fare, born at Valgorge located in Vivarais in 1644, was the son of Charles de La Fare and Jacqueline de Borne.

La Fare was captain of the bodyguards of Philippe of Orléans. He entered his military career and served with distinction with the Maréchal de Turenne, with whom he became friends, during the campaigns of 1667 and 1674. A love rivalry with Louvois, secretary of War, concerning Madame de Rochefort, forced him to quit his service in the military.

La Fare fell in love with Marguerite de la Sablière, until he broke with her in 1679, and also had a short romance with Marie Champmeslé. He lived a lazy Epicurean life and was an amateur of good food.  He also attended the literary salons and festivals at the Château de Sceaux, organised by the Duchess of Maine. His friend Guillaume Amfrye de Chaulieu said of him that he was "made up of feelings and pleasure, full of amiable weakness". He died in Paris in 1712.

Works
La Fare's poetry reflected his lifestyle. His verses praised the charms of rest and pleasure and were, according to the author, composed only for pleasure and without purpose.
 He wrote the libretto for an opera, Panthea, put on music by Philippe II, Duke of Orléans.
 His Poems were collected in volume in 1755.
 His memoirs of the principal events of the reign of Louis XIV (1715), are precise and full of finesse.

Marriage and children 
On 3 November 1684, La Fare married Jeanne de Lux.  They had 4 children:
Philippe Charles de La Fare (1687–1752), Marshal of France
Étienne Joseph de La Fare, Bishop of Laon
Jacqueline-Thérèse de La Fare (1686–1688)
Marie de La Fare, married in 1706 with Jean-François de La Fare-Montclar, cousin of her father.

1644 births
1712 deaths
Counts of France
French marquesses